Nizofenone (Ekonal, Midafenone) is a neuroprotective drug which protects neurons from death following cerebral anoxia (interruption of oxygen supply to the brain). It might thus be useful in the treatment of acute neurological conditions such as stroke.

References 
The following articles should be added in references:

Yasuda H (1999). Prevention of neurodegeneration by a neuroprotective radical scavenger.  
Ann N Y Acad Sci. 893: 430-3.  PMID: 10672283

Hayashi Y, Shimada O, Yasuda H, Ikegami K (1994). 
Effect of nizofenone on experimental head trauma in mice. 
Arch Int Pharmacodyn Ther 328(3): 251-60.   PMID:  7625881 

Yasuda H, Kishiro K, Izumi N, Nakanishi M (1985).
Biphasic liberation of arachidonic and stearic acids during cerebral ischemia.  
J Neurochem. 45(1): 168-72.  PMID: 2987409

Yasuda H, Ochi H, Tsumagari T (1984).
Stimulation of prostacyclin synthesis by nizofenone.  
Biochem Pharmacol. 33(17): 2707-9.  PMID: 6431991

Saito I, Asano T, Ochiai C, Takakura K, Tamura A, Sano K (1983).
A double-blind clinical evaluation of the effect of Nizofenone (Y-9179) on delayed ischemic neurological deficits following aneurysmal rupture.  
Neurol Res. 5(4): 29-47.   PMID: 6149485

Ochiai C, Asano T, Takakura K, Fukuda T, Horizoe H, Morimoto Y (1982).
Mechanisms of cerebral protection by pentobarbital and nizofenone correlated with the course of local cerebral blood flow changes.  
Stroke. 13(6): 788-96.   PMID: 7147293

Yasuda H, Shimada O, Nakajima A, Asano T (1981).
Cerebral protective effect and radical scavenging action.  
J Neurochem. 37(4): 934-8.  PMID: 7320731 

Yasuda H, Nakanishi M, Tsumagari T, Nakajima A, Nakanishi M (1979).
The mechanism of action of a novel cerebral protective drug against anoxia I. The effect on cerebral energy demand.  
Arch Int Pharmacodyn Ther. 242(1): 77-85.   PMID: 543750

Tamura A, Asano T, Sano K, Tsumagari T, Nakajima A (1979).
Protection from cerebral ischemia by a new imidazole derivative (Y-9179) and pentobarbital. A comparative study in chronic middle cerebral artery occlusion in cats.  
Stroke. 10(2): 126-34.  PMID: 442136    
 

Nitrobenzenes
Imidazoles
Ketones
Chloroarenes
Diethylamino compounds